The Fletcher School's International Security Studies Program (ISSP or ISS) is a center for the study of international security studies and security policy development. It was established in 1971 at The Fletcher School of Law and Diplomacy, Tufts University. ISSP conducts its academic activity through courses, simulations, conferences, and research. It also has a military fellows program for midcareer U.S. officers.

History

Prior to the establishment of ISSP, the Fletcher School was already offering courses in security studies, with also a significant number of master and PhD theses exploring the political-military and security-related topics.

In 1971 ISSP was established with the financial support of the Scaife Family Charitable Trust. With it came a more formalized program and expanded course offering.

The program was founded during the tenure of Dean Edmund A. Gullion (a former diplomat in Vietnam, and deputy director of the U.S. Disarmament Administration). Professor Uri Ra'anan, faculty member at the Fletcher School since 1968, become the first chairman of ISSP. In the creation of the program, he was assisted by his colleague Robert Pfaltzgraff. Upon Ra'anan's departure from the school in 1987 to join Boston University, Pfaltzgraff succeeded him, taking the title of director. He was succeeded by Richard Shultz in 1989.

ISSP followed its contemporary developments, in its first 20 years focusing on issues like the Cold War, nuclear proliferation, European security, crisis management, low intensity conflict and intelligence. Shortly after the end of the Cold War, in 1991, the ISSP in cooperation with Columbia University's International Security Policy Program, and the National Strategy Information Center, conducted an extensive curriculum review. This joint effort resulted in the publication of two books: Security Studies for the 1990s (1993) followed by an updated Security Studies for the 21st Century (1997). In them, security specialists were asked to review the curriculum of their subfields in light of the dramatic changes in global politics, with each author providing a syllabus for a graduate course along with analysis essays, and brief critiques. The books advocated for a broadened scope of the field, that had previously over-emphasized deterrence (in the Western alliance and the post-1945), to also include peace missions, non-military instruments of power and the influence of culture and values.

In 2005 the Jebsen Center for Counter-Terrorism Studies was established within ISSP. Its purpose was increasing the understanding and competency of counter-terrorism professionals. Two main areas of research were predicting, preventing and preempting terrorist activity, and the role of women and business in the campaign against terrorism. Its activities included the creation of a database that collected historical data on the life paths of hundreds of terrorists and analyzed their letters, wills, and interviews. This information, based on open-source data, was used to identify the factors that tend to predict terrorist acts. Russell D. Howard, a retired U.S. Army general and Founding Director of the Combating Terrorism Center at West Point, was appointed as the director of the center. The center was funded by Jan Henrik Jebsen, a Norwegian businessman and philanthropist, with a three-year grant of $1.5 million. The center closed in 2008, after three years of activity.

Scope and methodology

ISSP places security studies within the broader framework of international relations. It offers courses on time-tested subjects, namely role of force, crisis management, military strategy, decision making, intelligence, civil-military relations. It also has followed the contemporary developments, studying salient issues of each period like the Cold War, wars of national liberation, nuclear proliferation, collective security, low-intensity conflict, non-state actors. These studies have benefited of being in conjunction with the other fields of study in the school, including regional studies, and courses of political science, history, economics, and law, as the set of factors that either condition, influence or limit armed conflict.

An emphasis is placed in the civil-military exchanges as well as fomenting interactions between US and foreign students. Professor Robert L. Pfaltzgraff highlighted the importance of the international aspect of the school by pointing that "It's much more beneficial for the students from the US to have experience with students from elsewhere," arguing that the "US national security is set within an international security setting."

Activities

Simulex
Since 1974 ISSP has conducted annually an international crisis simulation, called Simulex, that spans over two days. The simulation puts real countries in hypothetical but realistic crisis situations. Students are teamed into the civil and military leadership of each country involved, need to react to sudden and mounting crises, make decisions, and report those to the Control Team, who oversees and manages the evolution of the entire scenario. These decisions can be of economic, military or diplomatic nature. Organizers and participants in the simulation also include members of the U.S. Army, Navy, Marine Corps, and Air Force, from multiple institutions including the continuing involvement of the United States Army War College.

Since the inception of Simulex, Professor Robert Pfaltzgraff has designed the scenarios, which typically reflect contemporary tensions and developments. Notably, Simulex 1989 scenario envisioned the fall of the Berlin Wall, which was played one week before the actual event.

Annual security conference and guest speakers

ISSP jointly with the Institute for Foreign Policy Analysis (IFPA) hold an annual security conference since 1972, focusing on topical issues of contemporary relevance. These conferences have had cosponsors including the U.S. Army, Air Force, the Office of Net Assessment, and the Marine Corps University. Attendance include participants from the U.S. Congress, the military, and academia, as well as other civilians from the U.S. and abroad. ISSP and IFPA have published a book, briefing, or report after each annual conference, outlining the contributions of the participants.

In 2013, ISSP and IFPA held their 40th annual security conference, in cooperation with U.S. Special Operations Command (USSOCOM). The conference, titled "Positioning Special Operations Forces for Global Challenges", was attended, among other speakers, by Adm. William H. McRaven (USN, commander, USSOCOM), Congressman Buck McKeon (chairman, House Armed Services Committee), Ambassador Thomas R. Pickering, and Deputy Secretary of Defense Ashton Carter.

ISSP also holds individual speaker series, with civilian policymakers and military commanders invited as guest speakers talking on diverse issues such as the North Korea nuclear program, Nicaraguan insurgency,  or the role of the U.S. Air Force in the Gulf War. Some notable speakers have been Gen. David Petraeus, Gen. Stanley A. McChrystal, Gen. Carter Ham, Jamie Morin (Acting Undersecretary of the US Air Force), David Sanger, (Chief Washington Correspondent for The New York Times), Javier Solana (Secretary-General of the Council of the European Union).

Advanced programs
Besides ISSP's course offering, it also has a program for mid-career military officers, and a doctoral program.

ISS Senior Military Fellows Program

In addition to military personnel enrolling in the standard degrees at the school, every year select field grade officers from all branches of the US Armed Forces are sponsored as fellows to go study at the Fletcher School, in lieu of attending war college. This includes the Marine Corps, which in 1985 started to sponsor Commandants of the Marine Corps as fellows to study at ISSP.

Major Jay L. Hatton positively valued this program, pointing that the breadth and depth of Fletcher's educational experience provide the knowledge and analytical skills enabling them to access policy-making or scholarly posts. These include becoming faculty at the Marine Corps University, a staff officer at Headquarters Marine Corps, or working on peacekeeping operations. He also highlighted the value of bringing diversity of views to the school, and the value of the fellow's academic research in informing policy. Graduates from the program have also reached the rank of flag officer.

Doctoral program
ISSP offers a doctoral program. From 1971 to 1991, it awarded 73 PhDs, many being on the Cold War, but also other topics like transnational terrorism, the implications of a multinuclear world, nonviolent resistance movements, counterinsurgency strategy, and crisis decision-making. In the post-cold war period between 1991 and 2013, 112 more PhD dissertations were completed. Dissertation topics included WMD proliferation, counterterrorism strategy and policy, humanitarian interventions, the management of non-traditional crises, strategic information warfare, cyber space, rethinking deterrence, special operations, and the changing dimensions of alliances and security cooperation.

Journal

In 2013 ISSP launched the Fletcher Security Review, an online academic journal. Haider Ali Hussein Mullick, adjunct professor at the Naval War College, became its first editor-in-chief.

Faculty

Current
 Richard H. Shultz Jr. is an expert and early scholar of insurgency, with his early works including influential research on guerrilla warfare in Vietnam. He notably published The Secret War Against Hanoi, and The Marines Take Anbar. He is also an expert on terrorism, intelligence gathering and internal conflicts. Shultz has been the director of ISSP since 1989. He entered the Fletcher School in 1983, and was the Associate Professor and later Professor of International Politics. Shultz has served on the Special Operations Policy Advisory Group of the U.S. Department of Defense, where he was the only civilian in that position. He has also done security research and served as advisor for several U.S. civil and military organizations, and held chairs at the U.S. Military Academy, U.S. Naval War College, and the U.S. Department of Defense. He has testified in the U.S. congress.
 Robert L. Pfaltzgraff Jr. is a political scientist specialized in security policy, international relations theory and crisis management. He entered the Fletcher Faculty in 1970, and is the Shelby Cullom Davis Professor of International Security Studies at Fletcher. He is also the founder and president of the Institute for Foreign Policy Analysis, a policy consulting organization. He also served as the director of the ISSP at Fletcher. He has testified in the U.S. congress.
Antonia Handler Chayes,  is Professor of Practice in International Politics. She previously taught at the Kennedy School of Government, Harvard, and the Harvard Law School. She specializes in international treaties, international security and arms control, and civil military relations. During the Carter Administration she was Assistant and later, Under Secretary of the US Air Force, where she was awarded the Distinguished Service Medal. She has served on several Federal Commissions, including the Commission on Roles and Missions of the United States Armed Forces.  She is a member of the Council on Foreign Relations. She has served as a consultant to the Office of Compliance, Adviser, Ombudsman of IFC and MIGA of the World Bank and served on the Executive Council of the American Society of International Law since 2009. Chayes was a Board member of United Technologies Corporation for 21 years, and was Vice Chair and Senior Consultant of Conflict Management Group (CMG), a non-profit international dispute resolution organization.

Former
 Uri Ra'anan is international security scholar with research focus on soviet and post-soviet issues. He was the Professor of International Politics at Fletcher from 1967 to 1987, and headed ISSP from its inception until 1987. Concurrently, he was the director of Boston University's Center for the Study of Ideology, Conflict and Policy. After Fletcher Ra'anan worked at Boston University until his retirement in 2009. He has also taught at MIT, Columbia University, and the City University of New York. He was an advisor of U.S. President Ronald Reagan. Ra'anan was a refugee escaping Hitler's Europe in 1939.
 William C. Martel specialized in studying the leadership and policymaking processes in organizations, strategic planning, cyber and space, and technology innovation. He was an Associate Professor of International Security Studies at the Fletcher School, until his death in 2015. He had also taught at the U.S. Air War College and U.S. Naval War College, done research in DARPA, and has been an Advisor to the U.S. Air Force.

Prominent alumni
Some prominent alumni include:
Admiral James G. Stavridis, former Supreme Allied Commander NATO, Europe.
Dr. Konstantine Karamanlis, former the Prime Minister of Greece. 
Admiral Patrick M. Walsh former commander of the U.S. Pacific Fleet, former Vice Chief of Naval Operations. 
Professor Philip Zelikow, White Burkett Miller Professor of History at the University of Virginia, and director of several congressional commissions.
Dr. Stephen Flynn, President of the Center for National Policy
Hassan Abbas, holding the joint professorship at Columbia's School of International and Public Affairs (SIPA) and South Asia 	Institute at the School of Arts and Science.
General Joseph F. Dunford Jr.

Publications

Conference books and reports

For each annual conference, ISSP published a book or report to encapsulate the topics discussed. The publications range from collections of presented essays, to transcripts or summaries of speaker sessions.

Other publications

 American sea power and global strategy (Pergamon-Brassey's, cop. 1985), by Robert J. Hanks.  
Naval expeditionary forces and power projection : into the 21st century, (Command and Staff College Foundation, 1993.) 
 Security Studies for the 1990s, edited by Richard Shultz, Roy Godson, and Ted Greenwood (New York: Brassey’s, 1993) 
 Ethnic Conflict and Regional Instability: Implications for U.S. Policy and U.S. Anny Roles and Missions (Carlisle Barracks, Perma.: Strategic Studies Institute, U.S. Army War College, 1994) 
 The national security strategy and the Korean Peninsula, by Murray A Neeper (U.S. Army War College, 1995) 
 Security Studies for the 21st Century, edited by Richard H. Shultz Jr., Roy Godson, and George Quester (Washington/ London: Brassey’s, 1997) 
 The Role of Naval Forces in 21st Century Operations, edited by Richard H. Shultz, Robert L. Pfaltzgraff (Brassey's, 2000)

References

External links

IFPA-Fletcher annual conference official website
Institute for Foreign Policy Analysis official website
Fletcher Security Review - The Security Studies Journal of the Fletcher School, Tufts University

Security studies
Tufts University